County routes in Schenectady County, New York, are not signed with route markers; however, they are frequently posted on street blade signs.

Routes 1–100

Routes 101 and up

See also

County routes in New York

References

External links
Empire State Roads – Schenectady County Roads